The  were a class of minesweepers of the Imperial Japanese Navy (IJN), serving during the Second Sino-Japanese War and World War II. Six vessels were built in 1937–1939 under the Maru 3 Keikaku.

Background
 Project number I4. They were built to update timeworn No.7 class, No.9 class and No.11 class. Kampon deleted minelayer facility from them, because IJN hoped they act in Yangtze River. And they added to one  naval gun for engage with National Revolutionary Army.

Ships in class

Footnotes

Bibliography
 Ships of the World special issue Vol.45, Escort Vessels of the Imperial Japanese Navy, (Japan), February 1996
 The Maru Special, Japanese Naval Vessels No.50, Japanese minesweepers and landing ships,  (Japan), April 1981

World War II mine warfare vessels of Japan
Minesweepers of Japan
Mine warfare vessels of the Imperial Japanese Navy
Gunboats of the Imperial Japanese Navy
Mine warfare vessel classes